St Harmons railway station was a station in St Harmon, Powys, Wales. The station opened in 1872 and closed in 1962.

References

Further reading

Disused railway stations in Powys
Railway stations in Great Britain opened in 1872
Railway stations in Great Britain closed in 1962
Former Cambrian Railway stations